Inuinnaqtun (natively meaning 'like the real human beings/peoples'), is an Inuit language. It is spoken in the central  Canadian Arctic. It is related very closely to Inuktitut, and some scholars, such as Richard Condon, believe that Inuinnaqtun is more appropriately classified as a dialect of Inuktitut. The government of Nunavut recognises Inuinnaqtun as an official language in addition to Inuktitut, and together sometimes referred to as Inuktut. It is also spoken in the Northwest Territories and is also recognised as an official language in addition to Inuvialuktun and Inuktitut.

Inuinnaqtun is used primarily in the communities of Cambridge Bay, Kugluktuk and Gjoa Haven in the Kitikmeot Region of Nunavut. Outside Nunavut, it is spoken in the hamlet of Ulukhaktok, where it is also known as Kangiryuarmiutun, forming a part of Inuvialuktun. It is written using the Roman orthography except in Gjoa Haven, where Inuit syllabics are used (as for Natsilingmiutut).

Inuinnaqtun phrases

See also
 Natsilingmiutut
 Utkuhiksalik

References

Further reading

 Harnum, Betty; McGrath, Janet; Kadlun, Margo. Inuinnaqtun Lessons Phase 1 : Copper Dialect of the Inuit Language. Cambridge Bay, N.W.T.: Kitikmeot Inuit Association, 1982.
 Harper, Kenn. Current Status of Writing Systems for Inuktitut, Inuinnaqtun and Inuvialuktun. [Yellowknife, N.W.T.]: Northwest Territories, Culture and Communications, 1992.
 Ohokak, Gwen; Kadlun, Margo; Harnum, Betty. Inuinnaqtun-English Dictionary. Cambridge Bay, Nunavut: Nunavut Arctic College, 1996.

External links
 Let's Speak Inuinnaqtun
 Inuktut Lexicon Atlas: Inuinnaqtun Word List
 Inuinnaqtun-English Dictionary (1996)
 Tuhaalanga: Learn Inuinnaqtun On-line
 Service Book of the Western Eskimos for Use in the Diocese of Mackenzie River Anglican liturgical text in Inuinnaqtun

Agglutinative languages
Inuvialuit languages
Indigenous languages of the North American Arctic
Copper Inuit
Inuktitut words and phrases